Daimí Pernía Figueroa (born December 27, 1976 in La Palma, Pinar del Río) is a retired Cuban athlete competing mainly in 400 m hurdles.
A former basketball player, she did not rise to international level until 1999, when she lowered her personal best from 55.51s to 52.89s and even became world champion.  She announced her retirement in 2007.

Personal bests
200 m: 23.43 s (wind: +1.8 m/s) –  Camagüey, 27 February 1999
400 m: 51.10 s –  Getafe, 10 July 2001
100 m hurdles: 14.31 s –  Santiago de Cuba, 4 May 1992
400 m hurdles: 52.89 s –  Sevilla, 25 August 1999

Achievements

References

External links

Tilastopaja biography
Ecured biography (in Spanish)

Cuban female hurdlers
1976 births
Living people
Athletes (track and field) at the 2000 Summer Olympics
Athletes (track and field) at the 2004 Summer Olympics
Athletes (track and field) at the 1999 Pan American Games
Athletes (track and field) at the 2003 Pan American Games
Athletes (track and field) at the 2007 Pan American Games
Olympic athletes of Cuba
World Athletics Championships medalists
Pan American Games gold medalists for Cuba
Pan American Games silver medalists for Cuba
Pan American Games medalists in athletics (track and field)
Universiade medalists in athletics (track and field)
Goodwill Games medalists in athletics
Central American and Caribbean Games gold medalists for Cuba
Competitors at the 2006 Central American and Caribbean Games
Universiade gold medalists for Cuba
Universiade silver medalists for Cuba
Universiade bronze medalists for Cuba
World Athletics Championships winners
Central American and Caribbean Games medalists in athletics
Medalists at the 1997 Summer Universiade
Medalists at the 1999 Summer Universiade
Competitors at the 2001 Goodwill Games
Medalists at the 1999 Pan American Games
Medalists at the 2003 Pan American Games
People from Pinar del Río Province